Biba Caggiano (October 18, 1936 – August 29, 2019) was an Italian-American cookbook author, television chef, and restaurateur.

Biography
She was born in Bologna. Her first exposure to professional cooking was through her mother, who owned and operated a trattoria in Bologna. She married a New Yorker named Vincent. She grew up cooking the food of her native Emilia-Romagna region. In 1960, she moved to New York, the hometown of her husband. In 1969, the family moved to Sacramento, which at the time did not have an Italian restaurant of note. In 1986, she opened her own restaurant, Biba, which went on to become one of the most famous Italian restaurants in California.

Both Caggiano and her restaurant won many prestigious awards. Caggiano's cooking show, Biba's Italian Kitchen, aired on TLC and Discovery Channel and lasted for over 100 episodes.

Caggiano was a cancer survivor. She died at age 82, after a two-year battle with Alzheimer and Parkinson's disease.

Books
As an author, Caggiano penned eight widely selling cookbooks, which together have reportedly sold more than 600,000 copies. These include the following:
 Trattoria Cooking
 Biba's Taste of Italy
 From Biba's Italian kitchen
 Italy al dente
 Biba's Italy
 Northern Italian Cooking
 Spaghetti Sauces

References

1936 births
2019 deaths
American chefs
American food writers
American women restaurateurs
American restaurateurs
Italian chefs
Italian emigrants to the United States
Italian food writers
Mass media people from Bologna
American women chefs
Women cookbook writers
Women food writers
Writers from Sacramento, California
21st-century American women